This is a list of the Brooklyn Nets' National Basketball Association (NBA) Draft selections.

Selections

References
 

 
National Basketball Association draft
draft history